The L-W-F T-3 was an American eight-passenger transport biplane built for the United States Army Air Service (USAAS) by the L-W-F Engineering Company Inc. Designated T-3 by the Army it was a conventional biplane powered by a  Liberty L-12A engine. It had an open cockpit for the pilot and an enclosed cabin for eight passengers. The sole T-3 was delivered to the USAAS in 1923, re-designated XT-3 and used as an engine test bed. A further nine T-3s on order were cancelled and not built.

Specifications

References

Further reading
 

1920s United States military utility aircraft
T-3
Biplanes
Single-engined tractor aircraft